Krešimir Zubak (born 25 January 1947) is a Bosnian Croat politician. At the beginning of the Bosnian War in 1992, he joined the Croatian Democratic Union. 

After Mate Boban left the position of president of the Croatian Republic of Herzeg-Bosnia, Zubak succeeded him. Under Zubak, the Croatian Defence Council and ARBIH established peaceful relations and the Washington agreement was signed. He later served as the inaugural President of the Federation of Bosnia and Herzegovina and was a member of the Presidency of Bosnia and Herzegovina. Zubak also served as Minister of Human Rights and Refugees.

He later founded the New Croatian Initiative.

Early life and career
Krešimir Zubak was born in Doboj. He graduated from the Faculty of Law in Sarajevo in 1970. For the next few years, he worked as a lawyer in a construction company, after which he began a judicial career. Zubak started his judicial career as Deputy Public Prosecutor in Doboj, after which he became President of the District Court in Doboj. From 1980 to 1984, he was Deputy Minister of Justice in the Socialist Republic of Bosnia and Herzegovina. After that, Zubak was president of the High Court in Doboj until 1992.

Bosnian War

Before the start of the Bosnian War, Zubak was re-employed at the Ministry of Justice, but returned home after Serb forces attacked the village of Usora. He was severely wounded during an unsuccessful operation to liberate Doboj, that is, to occupy the strategically important Putnik Hill. The bullet went between his chest and armpits and erupted outside in the lower spine. Because of that wound, Zubak became 40% disabled, and underwent surgery at a local hospital in Tešanj. His family was soon expelled from Doboj, and he went into exile in Vodice near Šibenik. Zubak soon went to Herzegovina, while the rest of his family, his wife and two sons, went to Zagreb, where his sons finished law.

After arriving to Herzegovina, he was appointed Minister of Justice in the Government of Herzeg-Bosnia. He is a signatorie of the Washington Agreement, signed on 18 March 1994. After then president of Herzeg-Bosnia, Mate Boban, resigned as president in Livno on 4 April 1994, Zubak was elected as his successor. The following month, on 31 May, he was elected the first President of the Federation of Bosnia and Herzegovina at the Constituent Assembly of the President of the Federation of Bosnia and Herzegovina.

Zubak participated in the negotiations on the conclusion of the Dayton Agreement. He finally signed the agreement on 14 December 1995.

After the war
Zubak signed the Saint Petersburg Agreement with Ejup Ganić in Saint Petersburg, which he considered a continuation of the previously signed Dayton Agreement. In it, Zubak and Ganić agreed on the gradual exclusion of the institutions of Herzeg-Bosnia and the Republic of Bosnia and Herzegovina, which was supposed to guarantee the federal character of the Federation. The agreement was criticized by Haris Silajdžić and in the end, it failed.

At the general election held in September 1996, Zubak was the Croatian Democratic Union (HDZ BiH) candidate for the Croat seat in the Presidency of Bosnia and Herzegovina. He managed to win the election with 330,477 (88.7%) votes. His strongest opponent was Ivo Komšić, candidate of the Joint List. 

Zubak left HDZ BiH in 1998 and founded the New Croatian Initiative (NHI). He welcomed Barry's amendments to the Rules and Regulations of the Provisional Election Commission, which allowed members of the Federal House of Peoples, regardless of their nationality, to be nominated and elected by all members of the Cantonal Assemblies. This made it possible for Croat envoys to be elected by Bosniaks. With his new party, Zubak joined the ruling civic-unitary coalition of the Alliance for Change, led by the Social Democratic Party (SDP BiH), where he was appointed Minister of Human Rights and Refugees on 22 February 2001. The coalition was ousted from power after the 2002 general election. Zubak's NHI did not achieve significant political success, and after a significant weakening, it merged with the Croatian Peasant Party (HSS BiH) to form the HSS-NHI in October 2007. Even the HSS-NHI, later renamed the Croatian National Alliance of Bosnia and Herzegovina, failed to make any significant political success.

After the general election held in October 2010, Zubak supported the creation of the so-called platform Government of the Federation of Bosnia and Herzegovina without the presence of Croat legitimate representatives. When the Croatian Democratic Union 1990 (HDZ 1990) refused to join such a government, which included its coalition partner, the Croatian Party of Rights of Bosnia and Herzegovina (HSP BiH), Zubak claimed that HDZ 1990 "is commiting political suicide". Later, his party, the Croatian National Alliance of Bosnia and Herzegovina, was merged in to HDZ 1990, and the party leadership was co-opted into the HDZ 1990 leadership, while Zubak himself withdrew from further political life.

He is married and has two sons, also lawyers.

Honours and decorations

International

Notes

References

External links

Report feature 

1947 births
Living people
People from Doboj
Croats of Bosnia and Herzegovina
Presidents of the Federation of Bosnia and Herzegovina
Politicians of the Federation of Bosnia and Herzegovina
Croatian Peasant Party of Bosnia and Herzegovina politicians
Croatian Democratic Union of Bosnia and Herzegovina politicians
Members of the Presidency of Bosnia and Herzegovina
Human rights ministers of Bosnia and Herzegovina